The 2003 Molson Indy Vancouver was the eleventh round of the 2003 CART World Series season, held on July 27, 2003 on the streets of Concord Pacific Place in Vancouver, British Columbia, Canada.

Qualifying results

Race

Caution flags

Notes

 New Race Record Paul Tracy 1:57:54.322
 Average Speed 90.632 mph

References

External links
 Full Weekend Times & Results

Vancouver
Molson Indy Vancouver
Indy Vancouver
2003 in British Columbia